Arthur Pearson (11 February 1896 – 11 February 1963) was an Australian rules footballer who played with Hawthorn in the Victorian Football League (VFL).

Early life
Born and raised in Hawthorn, Arthur Pearson was the youngest of the seven boys born to Nathaniel Knight Pearson (1860–1920) and Jane Pearson (1858–1934), nee Malcolm.

Football
Pearson commenced his career with Hawthorn Juniors and joined Hawthorn for the 1922 season, playing almost every game over the next three years. He stayed with the club when they entered the VFL in 1925 and played six matches, including being one of the better players in Hawthorn's first ever VFL match. He retired at the end of the 1925 VFL season.

Later life
Arthur Pearson never married and worked as an engineer after his football career. 

Pearson died on 11 February 1963 and is buried with his mother and brother at Burwood Cemetery.

Notes

External links 

Arthur Pearson's playing statistics from The VFA Project

1896 births
1963 deaths
Australian rules footballers from Melbourne
Australian Rules footballers: place kick exponents
Hawthorn Football Club (VFA) players
Hawthorn Football Club players
People from Hawthorn, Victoria